Pooja Sharma is an Indian actress and model who primarily works in Hindi television. She made her acting debut in 2012 with an episodic role in Teri Meri Love Stories. Sharma is best known for her portrayal of Draupadi in Mahabharat and Mahakali/Parvati in Mahakali — Anth Hi Aarambh Hai.

Career

Pageantry
Sharma was one of the top 10 finalists of Femina Miss India 2006 edition. She also won the subtitle 'Miss Beautiful Hair' in the pageant.

Television
Sharma worked as an anchor for a sports-based talk show on Doordarshan, and for Zoom TV during her college days. She made her acting debut in 2012 with Star Plus's Teri Meri Love Stories, where she played Siya Behl, an episodic role. In 2013, she portrayed the role of Draupadi on Star Plus's Mahabharat. The show was critically and commercially successful. The show ended in August 2014. In the end of 2014, she was seen as Lakshmi in comedy show, Ajab Gajab Ghar Jamai on Big Magic. In 2015, she was seen in a cameo appearance in Dosti... Yaariyan... Manmarziyan on Star Plus.

After a two and half year absence from television, in 2017, Sharma was seen portraying the role of Mahakali/Parvati on Colors TV's Mahakali — Anth Hi Aarambh Hai. In 2018 and 2019, she voiced over for a show and narrated three shows.

Media
Sharma was ranked 17th in Times Most Desirable Women On Television List 2017.

Filmography

As actor

As voice artist

Awards and nominations

References

External links
 

Living people
Indian soap opera actresses
Indian television actresses
People from Delhi
Year of birth missing (living people)